The Sorcerer's Apprentice is a British film of 2001 directed by David Lister and starring Robert Davi and Kelly LeBrock.

The film was made in South Africa but is set in England.

Outline
The wicked sorceress Morgana (Kelly LeBrock) plans to rule the world, but for fourteen hundred years all her efforts have failed. Once in every century, she tries to recover Fingall’s magic staff and unite it with a magic stone in the possession of the wizard Merlin, a combination of devastating power. Merlin, now an elderly man living under the name of Milner (Robert Davi), still has the stone.

Milner befriends a neighbour, a fourteen-year old boy called Ben Clark (Byron Taylor), who has recently migrated from South Africa, and sees that he has the same scar as a bearer of Fingall’s staff that he had known in the 6th century. Ben is fascinated by magic, and Milner begins to teach him to be a magician. The staff of Fingall is now on display in a museum of which Ben’s father (Greg Melvill-Smith) is the curator. As Morgana enters the story, Ben has to make his own choice between good and evil.

Cast
Kelly LeBrock as Morgana
Robert Davi as Milner 
Byron Taylor as Ben Clark 
Anne Power as Carol Clark 
Greg Melvill-Smith as Mike Clark 
Dale Cutts as Fingall 
Gideon Emery as Sly
Martin Le Maitre as Filo 
Clinton Dooley as Mark Evans 
Roxanne Burger as Nicole 
Terence Reis as First Knight 
Lawrence Joffe as Second Knight 
Sean Taylor as schoolteacher

Notes

External links
 
The Sorcerer's Apprentice, Rotten Tomatoes
The Sorcerer's Apprentice, YouTube

2001 fantasy films
2001 television films
2001 films
2000s English-language films
Films based on works by Johann Wolfgang von Goethe
Works based on The Sorcerer's Apprentice
Films directed by David Lister